Mukharby Nurbiyevich Kirzhinov (born 1 January 1949 in Koshekhabl, Adygea) is a former Soviet weightlifter, Olympic champion and world champion. He won gold medal in the lightweight class at the 1972 Summer Olympics in Munich.

References

1949 births
Living people
People from Koshekhablsky District
Russian male weightlifters
Soviet male weightlifters
Weightlifters at the 1972 Summer Olympics
Olympic weightlifters of the Soviet Union
Olympic gold medalists for the Soviet Union
Olympic medalists in weightlifting
Sportspeople from Adygea
Medalists at the 1972 Summer Olympics